Pet Alien is a French-American computer-animated series produced by Mike Young Productions, Taffy Entertainment, Antefilms Productions, and John Doze Studios in 2005. It was created by Pajanimals creator Jeff Muncy and the episodes are mainly written by Dan Danko and directed by Andrew Young. The series centres on 12-year-old Tommy Cadle, whose lighthouse is invaded by five aliens. It aired on Cartoon Network and Kabillion in the United States. 52 episodes were produced, making 104 segments.

Production
Similar to some low-budget shows, the series uses only four voiceover actors; Charlie Schlatter, Charles Adler, Jess Harnell and Candi Milo. Harnell was even the voice director of the show and voiced three characters: Gumpers, Swanky and Granville.

Characters

Main characters
Tommy Cadle - Tommy Cadle was a happy kid who had no cares in the world and did well in school, but at least until the aliens came along. Tommy is the scapegoat of the show and is bullied by some of the other kids because of the aliens actions. He gets really annoyed by the aliens actions. However he does generally accept the aliens as part of his life and sees Dinko as his close friend. The aliens always refer to him as "Tommy of Earth" and seem incapable of grasping that his name is just Tommy much to his annoyance. Voice of Charlie Schlatter.
Dinko - Dinko is the leader and biggest troublemaker of the alien gang. Though he always tries to help Tommy, he always mucks things up, often because he misunderstands Tommy's words to the point of insanity. Often Dinko will go to extreme measures to solve his curiosity to these words and earth rituals. This all leads to Tommy getting punished and/or blamed for everything he and his friends do and the aliens get off scot-free. He and his gang came to Earth to make an invasion to take over the Earth so, he, Swanky, Gumpers, Flip, and Scruffy stayed at Tommy's house and loved living there. It is unknown if he will make the invasion. Voice of Charles Adler.
Gumpers - Gumpers is a big alien with a big appetite (and not just for food, e.g. eating shoes). He likes to burp and fart and also possesses a living tooth. He is very strong, but also very afraid. He appears to be extremely dumb most of the time, but he is capable of intelligent thoughts if he strains his brain hard enough. He has a large mouth and is mostly shown to be a genius at math, poetry, and more. Voice of Jess Harnell.
Swanky - Swanky is the smartest of the aliens.  He is rude, lazy, elegant and rather self-centered at times and has a British accent. He reluctantly accompanies Tommy and the aliens on their wacky adventures. He enjoys fancy things and massages and wants Tommy's room. Voice of Jess Harnell.
Scruffy and Flip - Dinko's pets. Scruffy is a dog-looking alien who jumps like a hare and whose tongue supposedly is smarter than himself. Flip is an alien that looks like a parrot with a lot of energy. It's difficult to understand what he's saying, although the last word uttered in his sentences often is in English. Voice of Charlie Adler.

Major characters
Gabby - Gabby is Tommy’s best friend. She is in love with Tommy, but unfortunately he doesn't feel the same way. In several episodes it is revealed that she can smell when Tommy is in trouble. Gabby has a Mexican accent. Voice of Candi Milo.
Granville DeSpray - Granville is a direct descendant of DeSpray Bay's founders, as you can tell from his name, and as such he values old English traditions like teatime. Oddly, all the characters think he is Norwegian. Granville is hopelessly in love with Melba and has numerous times, to no avail, attempted to win her heart. He hates Tommy and always blames him for anything bad that happens. He only has one friend; the statue Admiral Puff. He has another dog statue named Jean Claude. He always tries to impress Melba by acting street and displaying hip-and-hop. Voice of Jess Harnell.
Clinton Fillmore Jefferson XIII - Clinton competes in any kind of sports available and usually wins. He is also a bully who likes to annoy others including Tommy. He has a Canadian accent and his catchphrase is "Losah!" which he refers to people as such title. Voice of Charlie Schlatter.
Melba Manners - Melba is a spoiled brat who is the arch-enemy of Tommy. She enjoys forcing him to do tedious or tiresome tasks, thanks to her loud and shrill voice sounds similar as the Horrid Henry character Moody Margaret. She is also an exceptionally clever opponent in staring competitions. Despite her last name, she is very impolite. Like the other humans, she is too stupid to tell that the aliens are aliens. She just calls them Tommy's "things". Voice of Candi Milo.
Cap'n Spangley - Cap'n Spangley is an old sailor who is a little crazy. He is afraid of water and crustaceans and he runs the local taffy shop which Tommy and the aliens visit at least daily. Voice of Charlie Adler.

Minor/recurring characters
Robyn Cadle - Tommy's mom who lives in a house located near to Tommy's lighthouse. The viewers never get to see her, as she keeps contact with her son solely through a speaker installed in Tommy's bedroom. Voice of Candi Milo.
Old Man Bitters - Old Man Bitters is Cap'n Spangley's enemy and the angry man fishing.
Emperor Breet - Emperor Breet is an evil emperor who now and then journeys to Earth to kidnap the aliens living with Tommy. Unfortunately, he always loses the right to take them in a game he isn't very clever at, and therefore despises: the musical chairs.
Doctor Daffodil - Doctor Daffodil is the doctor Dinko and his friends consults whenever Tommy needs a doctor. Unfortunately, his methods can be highly dangerous and Tommy therefore tries to evade him as much as possible. Other times he does nothing but mocks the patient such as telling Tommy when his hand inflated that his friends would point and laugh at him. It is then revealed that his friends call him a name that sounds like something that Flip would say (there both voiced by Adler) but only his patients call him Dr. Daffodil. Voice of Charlie Adler.
Tommy's Teacher - Tommy's teacher appears in some episodes that revolve in school. In one episode, she gave Tommy his first B- for his inflated hand and degraded it to a C+ when the hand shrunk and to a C- when his leg inflated. Voice of Candi Milo.
Swanky's Parents (Mom-sicle and Popsicle) - Swanky's parents who are red-necked unlike their son.
The Mime - A mime that tries to enter the lighthouse but is always stopped by Flip.
The Frog - A banjo playing frog that appears in some episodes often as intermission for a new scene or a gag.

Video game 

A video game based on the series was released in the United States on July 30, 2007 for the Nintendo DS handheld console. It is a puzzle game developed by Shin'en Multimedia and published by The Game Factory.

Reception 
The show was nominated for a Daytime Emmy Award in the category "Outstanding Performer in an Animated Program", which was Jess Harnell (Swanky), at the 33rd Daytime Emmy Awards.

Episodes

Season 1 (2005)

Season 2 (2005)

Home media
20th Century Fox Home Entertainment released only four compilations of the series on DVD and VHS on October 18, 2005 to February 7, 2006 only in Region 1. Each compilation contained four segment-episodes from the first season.

References

External links 
 Official Splash Entertainment Website 
 

2005 American television series debuts
2005 American television series endings
2000s American animated television series
American children's animated comic science fiction television series
American computer-animated television series
Animated television series about children
Animated television series about extraterrestrial life
Cartoon Network original programming
Antefilms Production animations
English-language television shows
Plaion
Television series by Splash Entertainment